Cottrell Corners is an unincorporated community located within Old Bridge Township in Middlesex County, New Jersey, United States. Located at the corner of Old Bridge-Matawan Road (County Route 516) and Cottrell Road, the area is named for the Cottrell Family who owned an apple farm at the crossroads since before the United States was founded. Though the last parcel of the farmland had originally been sold to a developer in 2002, the Middlesex County Freeholder Board purchased the property and intends to preserve it. In addition to the farm, the area contains stores, a townhouse development, and is the seat of the Old Bridge municipal offices and library.

References

Old Bridge Township, New Jersey
Unincorporated communities in Middlesex County, New Jersey
Unincorporated communities in New Jersey